The MP-446 Viking is a 9mm semi-automatic handgun originating from Russia.

Overview 
It was created by the Izhevsk Mechanical Plant.

It weighs at around  when unloaded, and has a magazine capacity of 18 rounds. The pistol is a sport/civilian version of Yarygin PYa (MP-443) pistol which has been used by Russian military since 2003. MP-446 is short recoil-operated, locked breech pistol. The key differences between MP-446 and MP-443 are the frame material (polyamide rather than steel) and barrel construction: the barrel of the MP-446 was intentionally weakened to prevent safe use of high-powered armour-piercing military rounds (i.e. Russian 9x19mm 7N21 type, 9x19mm NATO) or civilian "+P" or "+P+" cartridges.

Variants 
 MP-446 "Viking" (export variant) - with 18-round magazine
 MP-446 "Viking" (civilian 9mm Luger sport pistol) - with 10-round magazine
 MP-446C "Viking" - sport modification of МР-446 "Viking" pistol. It was developed according to requirements of the International Practical Shooting Confederation (IPSC). In 2003 МР-446С "Viking" was included in the official list of weapons used in the international competitions according to IPSC rules (upgraded shooting accuracy and patterning in comparison with a base variant; opportunity to adjust trigger travel after a shot; Adjustable sights; 120 mm barrel length version is available)
 MP-446C "Viking-M" - an improved version of the MP-446C, with considerations for a modern civilian markets, such as a standard Picatinny rail on the underside of the frame, removable sights that are compatible with aftermarket Glock examples, a longer barrel likely for the option of threading for aftermarket devices with reinforcement in stressful areas, increased part durability to a claimed 50,000 rounds, improved feed ramp, and improved magazines while retaining the ability to function with older examples.

Users 
 
  - adopted as training pistol
  - since 2003 adopted as training pistol

See also
List of Russian weaponry

Notes

Sources 
 Pistole MP-446 Viking // "Střelecký Magazin", № 2, 2004
 Ивица Дамески. Руски пиштол „МП 446 Викинг“ // "Штит", № 103, маj 2018. стр.32-33

External links

Izhevsk Mechanical Plant (MP-446 Viking)
Instruction manual (MP-446 Viking)
Modern Firearms (MP-446 Viking).

Semi-automatic pistols of Russia
9mm Parabellum semi-automatic pistols
Izhevsk Mechanical Plant products